Xyris asperula  is an uncommon South American species of flowering plants in the yellow-eyed-grass family. It has been found in Bolivia and also in the States of Goiás and Minas Gerais in Brazil.

References

External links
Photo of herbarium specimen at Missouri Botanical Garden, collected in Goiás in 1966

asperula
Plants described in 1841
Flora of Bolivia
Flora of Brazil